is a Japanese manga series written by Ikki Kajiwara and illustrated by Takumi Nagayasu. It was adapted into a live-action television series in 1974 and into four live-action films in 1974, 1975, 1976 and 2012.

TV series

Cast
  Yūsuke Natsu
 Kimiko Ikegami 
  Hisayuki Nakajima
 Sei Hiraizumi

2012 film

The 2012 film version, directed by Takashi Miike, was alternatively titled For Love's Sake in English.

The basic plotline sees a cross-class love story between Ai (Emi Takei), the daughter of a well-respected Tokyo family, and delinquent Makoto (Satoshi Tsumabuki) who is seeking the leader of a female gang.

References

External links
 

1973 manga
1974 Japanese television series debuts
1975 Japanese television series endings
1976 comics endings
Ikki Kajiwara
Japanese television dramas based on manga
Kodansha manga
Live-action films based on manga
Manga adapted into films
Manga adapted into television series
Shōnen manga
TV Tokyo original programming
Gekiga
Japanese romance films